(Hangul: 사극, Hanja: 史劇) in Korean denotes historical dramas, including traditional drama plays, films or television series. In English language literature  usually refers to historical films and television series (of South Korea). In North Korea, South Korean historical dramas are generally called 고전 영화 (Hanja: 古典 映畫, RR: Gojeon Yeonghwa) or classic film.

The first known historical film, The Story of Chun-hyang filmed in 1923, was directed by a Japanese filmmaker. The first Korean sound film was also . The heyday of Korean cinema began in the 1950s and lasted until the 1980s, with many  films released, like Lee Gyu-hwan's Chunhyang adaptation in 1955. In the 1960s, historical melodramas were significant, as well as martial arts films. In the 1970s, due to the popularity of television, cinema started to decline, and in the 1980s it encountered a crisis, which prompted filmmakers to try to win viewers back with erotic pieces. From the 1990s, Im Kwon-taek's movies, as well as The Legend of Gingko and The Eternal Empire are significant works. From the 2000s,  films started flourishing, between 2012 and 2015 Korean cinema produced five  that broke the 10 million viewership record. As of 2016 June, the highest grossing South Korean film is also a historical drama: The Admiral: Roaring Currents.

In the 1970s, in contrast to the previous decade, historical TV series portrayed national heroes like Yi Sun-shin or Sejong the Great. The 1990s were dominated by contemporary dramas with regards to popularity and viewership ratings, despite having produced a number of quality . The 2000s saw the birth of the "fusion " genre, which changed the historical series genre in South Korea. Some of the significant works from this period are Hur Jun, Damo, Dae Jang Geum and Queen Seondeok.

Popular themes of  include elements from Korean folklore and mythology, famous or notorious princes, kings, national heroes and famous women.

History

Beginnings

The story of Chunhyang is a popular element of Korean folklore, recurring in Korean cinema, as well, having produced more than a dozen adaptations both in films and television series. Some cinematic milestones are also related to it, for example, Lee Myeong-woo's  in 1935 was the first Korean sound film. From 1940, the number of Korean films declined, due to the Japanese colonialist policies forbidding films other than propaganda movies. Many filmmakers fled the country, and those remaining had to join the pro-Japanese camp. After the second world war ended, filmmakers rather celebrated independence and did not make historical pieces.

After the Korean war, romanticism was the ruling school of 1950s historical movies in South Korea, often focusing on female characters. The roots of this can be traced back to theatres: grand changgeuks, or folk operas, had been popular, so much so, that they began to be adapted to film. Since these stories focused on human nature, fate, and feelings, actual historical backgrounds were irrelevant. These stories usually preferred the period of the Three Kingdoms of Korea, factual details of which were scarce, thus attention to historical factual accuracy could be avoided. In 1956,  adapted the story of Prince Hodong and the Princess of Nakrang, Korea's very own Romeo and Juliet tale.

The 1950s to the 1980s are considered the heyday of Chungmuro, or the Korean Hollywood, when more than 100 films were produced annually. The need for historical films was boosted by the success of such works as Lee Gyu-hwan's Chunhyang adaption (1955), Kim Ki-young's Yangsan Province or Jeon Chang-geun's  (King Gojong and martyr An Jung-Geun; 1959).

1960s
 successes of the 1960s were adaptations of works that had previously been successful in other art forms, for example as radio plays, theatrical plays, changgeuk operas or novels. Examples include  (1961),  ('Eunuch'; 1968) or Women of Yi Dynasty (1969). The atmosphere this time was more conservative than in the 1950s, partially due to Park Chung-hee's dictatorship. Conforming to the circumstances, historical melodramas were preferred, but there were exceptions like Jeong Chang-hwa's martial arts films, inspired by the Shaw Brothers. This is the period when Joseon became the focus of attention, depicting the relationship between kings and officials, determining the nature of historical films for the next decades. Viewers were now more interested in actual historical events than in mystified, old legends. By the 1960s, however, they got used to modernities, thus filmmakers turned to decadent themes or novel stories.

The first historical television series in South Korea was aired in 1962 on state channel KBS, titled , directed by Kim Jae-hyeong, set in the era of Goguryeo.

1970s
As television sets started to be rolled out en masse, the number of television series also grew. Just like in cinema, however, the policies of the ruling regime affected them as well. Thus dramatic historical figures were replaced by national heroes like general Yi Sun-shin or Sejong the Great.  of the time mixed legends and reality, the major cause of which was the enormous demand for TV series. Historical factual accuracy would have required scriptwriters to research historical documents written in hanja characters, which, considering the demand and the daily episodes, would have been impossible. Also, legends were easier to be dramatized.

As television dominated, cinema declined, and out of all the historic films of the period only two could achieve success at the box office: Lee Gyu-ung's  and yet another Chunhyangga adaptation, this time by Lee Seong-gu. Critics applauded other works, like Gate of Woman (1972), An Executioner (1974), Concentration of Attention (1976) or A War Diary (1977).

1980s

The series referenced official historical documents (albeit liberally to some extent) and often included debated events and themes. It was directed by Lee Byung-hoon, who later also helmed the popular hallyu series Dae Jang Geum. The state channel KBS aired Gaeguk ('Foundation of the Kingdom') which depicted King Taejo's usurpation of the Goryeo throne in an overtly positive light, reminiscent of Chun Du-hwan's rise in politics.

The diverse programming on television devoured viewers from attending cinemas, and the film industry had but one way out: show a genre that could not be accessed through television. This is why they turned to making erotic films, a good portion of which were set in historical times. Movies like Eoudong (1985) or Does the Cuckoo Cry at Night (1985) were also popular at the box office. Although erotic movies were popular, the  genre saw a decline in South Korean cinema generally.

1990s
At the beginning of the 1990s, historical films were scarce, except for Bae Chang-ho's  ('Dream'; 1990). The Eternal Empire, which received outstanding critics, was released in 1995. The film is significant for its different take on the popular story of Crown Prince Sado, focusing on the political aftermath of his death, rather than the pain of the prince himself. Although it did not do well at the box office, the film received eight awards at the Grand Bell Awards, including Best Film and Best Director. Im Kwon-taek's period films are also noteworthy, as well as The Legend of Gingko from 1996.

However, viewership ratings could not match up to that of contemporary Korean dramas, only a few could reach 30%, while for example the modern themed Eyes of Dawn recorded 58.3%, Sandglass broke 50.8%.

Since 2000
At the beginning of the 2000s,  were preferred by older generations. Young people chose to watch contemporary series, which they could better relate to.  were often complicated, archaic in language use, and mainly employed older actors — thus were less appealing to younger generations. A change in attitude is attributed to producer and director Lee Byung-hoon, who entrusted the script of Hur Jun to a young, up-and-coming scriptwriter, Choi Wan-gyu. Instead of dry historical facts and distant wars, the series focused on emotions and relationships, revolving around the legendary Joseon royal physician. A new genre, "fusion " was born, changing the structure and format of Korean historical television series. In 2003, actress Ha Ji-won starred in Damo, the first HDTV format Korean TV series. The drama merged characteristics of trendy modern dramas with Hong Kong style wire-fu action scenes, narrating a fictional story set in a real historical time.

As fusion  conquered televisions, they started to infiltrate cinema, as well. This can be attributed partially to the success of television dramas and partially to the international success of such Chinese historical epics like Crouching Tiger, Hidden Dragon, Hero or the American Gladiator, prompting the need to produce such works at home, as well. In 2003, Untold Scandal with drama icon Bae Yong-joon was released, but the real turning point in historical films came in 2005 with The King and the Clown, breaking box office records selling more than 12 million tickets. The most popular ones are also of the fusion type, mixing historical facts with fictional people or events. Such works include for example, The Face Reader or Masquerade. Apart from so-called palace dramas, spectacular action-filled  like War of the Arrows, The Grand Heist or Pirates are also successful in the 21st century. Film series have also appeared, like the Detective K-series, placing a crime investigation story into Joseon settings. Erotic period films experience a renaissance in South Korean cinema, with pieces like Forbidden Quest, The Servant or Empire of Lust.

Sungkyunkwan Scandal (2010), Moon Embracing the Sun (2012) and Love in the Moonlight (2016) were all  adapted from popular novels. They were initially targeted to a younger demographic but has since received mainstream and international success. The productions have also put the spotlight to then emerging actors Song Joong-ki, Yoo Ah-in, Kim Soo-hyun, Park Bo-gum and Kim Yoo-jung.

Large-scale s have been rarely produced, but when they were launched, they often caught the attention of the public. Most of them have been fantasy-based, telling the audience a unique story of kings and queens who lived in the ancient era. The most well-known one so far has been The Legend (2007), which featured the Hallyu star Bae Yong-joon. In 2018, Studio Dragon announced it is working on Arthdal Chronicles, a new fantasy  casting Song Joong-ki and Kim Ji-won. The drama started its first shooting on 1 June and recorded 8% personal best rating.

On March 5, 2017, Netflix announced that it had given the production a series order for a first season of Kingdom. Alongside the series announcement, it was confirmed that Kim Seong-hun would direct the series and that Kim Eun-hee would be credited as the writer. Production companies involved with the series were slated to consist of AStory.

Moreover, famous actors confirmed that they would join the web television series with plenty of political, supernatural and thrilling scenes. Those include Ju Ji-hoon, Ryu Seung-ryong, Bae Doona, Jeon Seok-ho, Kim Hye-jun and Heo Joon-ho. Director Park In-je joined the production and directed the second episode and onward from season two. On January 25, 2019, the first season of the series, consisting of six episodes, was released for streaming on Netflix. The second season, also consisting of six episodes, was released on March 13, 2020.

Lists
The following are notable Korean period drama series:

KBS 
 Empress Myeongseong (2001–2002)
 Royal Story: Jang Hui-bin (2002–2003)
 Emperor of the Sea (2004–2005)
 Hwang Jini (2006)
 Conspiracy in the Court (2007)
 Sungkyunkwan Scandal (2010)
 The Princess' Man (2011)
 Jeon Woo-chi (2012–2013)
 Gunman in Joseon (2014)
 The King's Face (2014–2015)
 The Merchant: Gaekju 2015 (2015–2016)
 Love in the Moonlight (2016)
 Hwarang: The Poet Warrior Youth (2016-2017)
 Queen for Seven Days (2017)
 The Tale of Nokdu (2019)
 Royal Secret Agent (2020-2021)
 River Where the Moon Rises (2021)
 Bloody Heart (2022)

Daeha Drama
 Daemyeong (1981)
 Wind and Cloud (1982)
 Foundation of the Kingdom (1983)
 Independence Gate (1984)
 Dawn (1985)
 Windfall (1986-1987)
 Yi-hwa (1987)
 Land (1987-1989)
 And So Flows History (1989-1990)
 Dawn of the Day (1990)
 The Royal Way (1991)
 Flowers That Never Wilt (1991-1992)
 Chronicles of the Three Kingdoms (1992-1993)
 The Break of Dawn (1993) 
 Kim Gu (1995)
 Dazzling Dawn (1995-1996)
 Tears of the Dragon (1996-1998)
 The King and the Queen (1998-2000)
 Taejo Wang Geon (2000-2002)
 The Dawn of the Empire (2002-2003)
 Age of Warriors (2003-2004
 Immortal Admiral Yi Sun-sin (2004–2005)
 Seoul 1945 (2006)
 Dae Jo-yeong (2006–2007)
 The Great King, Sejong (2008)
 Empress Cheonchu (2009)
 The King of Legend (2010–2011)
 Gwanggaeto, The Great Conqueror (2011-2012)
 Dream of the Emperor (2012-2013)
 Jeong Do-jeon (2014)
 The Jingbirok: A Memoir of Imjin War (2015)
 Jang Yeong-sil (2016)
 The King of Tears, Lee Bang-won (2021-2022)

MBC 
 Hur Jun (1999)
 Sangdo, Merchants of Joseon (2001)
 Damo (2003)
 Dae Jang Geum: Jewel in the Palace (2003)
 Shin Don: Powerful Servant of Koryo（2005)
 Jumong: Prince of Legend (2006–2007)
 The Legend (2007)
 Lee San, Wind of the Palace (2007)
 The Great Queen Seondeok (2009)
 Dong Yi: The Jewel in the Crown (2010)
 Gyebaek, Warrior's Fate (2011)
 Moon Embracing the Sun  (2012)
 Arang and the Magistrate (2012)
 God of War (2012)
 The King's Doctor (2012)
 Gu Family Book (2013)
 Goddess of Fire (2013)
 Empress Ki (2013)
 The King's Daughter, Soo Baek-hyang (2013-2014)
 Diary of a Night Watchman (2014)
 Shine or Go Crazy (2015)
 Splendid Politics (2015)
 The Scholar Who Walks the Night (2015)
 Flowers of the Prison (2016)
 Rebel: Thief Who Stole the People (2017)
 The Emperor: Owner of the Mask (2017)
 The King in Love (2017)
 Rookie Historian Goo Hae-ryung (2019)
 The Red Sleeve (2021–2022)
 The Forbidden Marriage (2022-2023)

 SBS 
 Ladies of the Palace (2002)
 King's Woman (2003)
 Jang Gil San (2004)
 Ballad of Seodong (2005–2005)
 The King and I (2007–2008)
 Iljimae (2008)
 Painter of the Wind (2008)
 Ja Myung Go (2009)
 Warrior Baek Dong-soo (2011)
 Deep Rooted Tree (2011)
 Faith (2012)
 Jang Ok-jung, Living by Love (2013)
 Secret Door (2014)
 Six Flying Dragons (2015)
 Moon Lovers: Scarlet Heart Ryeo (2016)
 Saimdang, Memoir of Colors (2017)
 My Sassy Girl (2017)
 Nokdu Flower (2019)
 Haechi (2019)
 Lovers of the Red Sky (2021)

 Cable 
 Insu, the Queen Mother (2011, JTBC)
 Queen In-hyun's Man (2012, tvN)
 Blooded Palace: The War of Flowers (2013, JTBC)
 More Than a Maid (2014, JTBC)
 The Three Musketeers (2014, tvN)
 Secret Healer: Mirror of the Witch (2016, JTBC)
 Grand Prince (2018, TV Chosun)
 100 Days My Prince (2018, tvN)
 Mr. Sunshine (2018, TVN)
 The Crowned Clown (2019, TVN)
 Flower Crew: Joseon Marriage Agency (2019, JTBC)
 My Country: The New Age (2019, JTBC)
 Queen: Love and War (2019-2020, TV Chosun)
 Kingmaker: The Change of Destiny (2020, TV Chosun)
 Mr. Queen (2020-2021, TVN)
 Bossam: Steal the Fate (2021, MBN)
 Alchemy of Souls (2022, tvN)
 Poong, the Joseon Psychiatrist (2022, tvN)
 Under the Queen's Umbrella'' (2022, tvN)

Popular themes
Popular themes include the following:

 Elements of Korean folklore: pansori tales like Chunhyangga; folk tales like Prince Hodong and the Princess of Nakrang; mythological creatures like 
 Three Kingdoms of Korea
 North–South States Period
 Goryeo kings, especially those with dramatic life stories, like King Taejo (Wang Geon), King Gwangjong (Wang So), King Gongmin (Wang Jeon) and King Gongyang (Wang Yo)
 Joseon princes and kings, especially those with dramatic life stories, like King Taejo (Yi Seong-gye), King Taejong (Yi Bang-won), King Sejong the Great (Yi Do), King Sejo (Yi Yu), King Yeonsan (Yi Yung), King Gwanghae (Yi Hon), Crown Prince Sado (Yi Seon), King Jeongjo (Yi San), Heungseon Daewongun (Yi Ha-eung), and Emperor Gojong (Yi Myeong-bok)
 Famous women, like Hwang Jini, Jang Hui-bin, Jang Nok-su, Queen Munjeong, Shin Saimdang, Jang-geum, Empress Myeongseong and Queen Seondeok
 Famous scholars, like Jeong Mong-ju, Jeong Do-jeon, Shin Suk-ju, Hwang Hui, Jo Gwang-jo, Yi Hwang, Yi I, Ryu Seong-ryong and Jung Yak-yong
 Famous soldiers, like Choi Young and Yi Sun-shin
 Cross-dressing heroines

See also
Historical drama

Notes

References